Das Testament may refer to:

Das Testament (opera) Kienzl 1916
Das Testament (E Nomine album)
The Testament of Dr. Mabuse Das Testament des Dr. Mabuse (1933), Fritz Lang